Muharraq is Bahrain's third largest city and served as its capital until 1932 when it was replaced by Manama. The population of Muharraq in 2012 was 176,583.

The city is located on Muharraq Island. Bahrain International Airport is also located on the island. Adjacent to Muharraq are the man-made Amwaj Islands, known for their large buildings, hotels and beaches. Muharraq is home to Muharraq Club, which is Bahrain's most successful football club. It is home to the famous Siyadi House. The city is also known for its souq (traditional market) and as a home of traditional arts and music; Ali Bahar, a popular and successful Bahraini singer is from Muharraq.

History

Muharraq was originally part of Dilmun, a Semitic speaking Bronze Age polity. Later, it became the city of Arwad on the island of Tylos (as Bahrain was referred to in antiquity), believed by some (including Strabo and Herodotus) to be the birthplace of Phoenicia. At the end of Persian rule, Bahrain came under the domination of the Seleucid Greeks, and Muharraq was the centre of a pagan cult dedicated to the shark god, Awal. The city's inhabitants, who depended upon seafaring and trade for their livelihood, worshipped Awal in the form of a large statue of a shark located in the city.

By the 5th century AD, Muharraq had become a major centre of Nestorian Christianity, which had come to dominate the southern shores of the Persian Gulf. As a sect, the Nestorians were often persecuted as heretics by the Byzantine Empire, but Bahrain was outside the Empire's control offering safety. The names of several of Muharraq's villages today reflect this Christian legacy, with Al-Dair meaning 'the monastery' and Qalali meaning a 'monk's cloisters'.

Taken by the Portuguese (1521) and the Persians (1602), Al-Muḥarraq passed to the control of the Āl Khalīfah dynasty in 1783 with the rest of Bahrain.

Economy
Gulf Air has its headquarters in Muharraq, and Bahrain Air formerly had its headquarters in the Mohamed Centre in Muharraq.

Government and infrastructure
Building 586 in Muharraq houses the headquarters of the Civil Aviation Affairs, an agency of the Ministry of Transportation.

Education

The Ministry of Education of Bahrain operates public government schools.

Boys schools include Abu Farias Al-Hamdani Primary Boys School, Al-Maari Primary Boys School, Hassan bin Thabit Primary Boys School, Omer bin Abdulazeez Primary Boys School, Sheikh Mohammed bin Essa al-Khalifa Primary Boys School, Omer bin Al-Kattab Primary Intermediate Boys School, Abdul-Rahman Al-Nasser Intermediate Boys School, Tariq bin Zeyad Intermediate Boys School, and Moharraq Secondary Boys School.

Girls schools include A'amena bint Wahab Primary Girls School, Al-Muharraq Primary Girls School, Mariam bent Omran Primary Girls School, Zubaida Primary Girls School, Istiklal, Khadija al-Kubra Intermediate Girls School, Zanoobia Intermediate Girls School, and Muharraq Secondary Girls School.

The French School of Bahrain is located in Busaiteen, in Muharraq Municipality.

Firjan (districts)

Firjan is the plural of the Arabic word Fareej which translates to district. The oldest and largest Fareej in Muharraq is Fareej Al Bin Ali. It was established by Sunni Arabs belonging to the Al Bin Ali tribe in the 17th century and until recently, members of the tribe still lived in that Fareej.

Other Firjan in Muharraq include: Al Bu Khmais, Al-Gumra, Al-Zayayina, Al-Ma'awida, Bin Ghatim, Al-Jowder, Bin Hindi, Al-'Amamira, Al-Mahmeed, Al-Hayaj (or Al-Hayayej), Al-Sanqal, Al-Dosa, Al-Sagha, Sheikh Abdullah Sheikh Hamad, and Bin Khatir are all Sunni districts. Unlike Manama's firjans which are mostly Shia, Muharraq has fareejs which are mostly Sunni.

See also

 Amwaj Islands, man-made islands near Al Muharraq.
 Christianity in Eastern Arabia

References 

 
Populated places in the Muharraq Governorate
Former municipalities (regions) of Bahrain